The Otăsău is a left tributary of the river Bistrița in Romania. It discharges into the Bistrița in Frâncești.

References

Rivers of Romania
Rivers of Vâlcea County